Stolen Moments is an album by guitarists Jimmy Raney and Doug Raney recorded in 1979 and released on the Danish label SteepleChase.

Reception 

Scott Yanow of AllMusic states "The guitarists blend together quite well, and often one does not know who is soloing; the results should delight fans of cool-toned modern mainstream guitar".

Track listing 
 "Jonathan's Waltz" (Jimmy Raney) – 3:55
 "Chelsea Bridge" (Billy Strayhorn) – 5:12
 "Stolen Moments" (Oliver Nelson) – 5:54
 "How My Heart Sings"  (Earl Zindars) – 4:52
 "I Should Care" (Axel Stordahl, Paul Weston, Sammy Cahn) – 6:41
 "Samba Teekens" (Jimmy Raney) – 6:10
 "Alone Together" (Arthur Schwartz, Howard Dietz) – 7:01

Personnel 
Jimmy Raney, Doug Raney – guitar
Michael Moore – bass
Billy Hart – drums

References 

Doug Raney albums
Jimmy Raney albums
1979 albums
SteepleChase Records albums